Since 2021, abortion is no longer a crime in Mexico, although its legalisation varies by state. On 7 September 2021, the Mexican Supreme Court unanimously ruled that penalising abortion is unconstitutional, setting an important precedent across the whole country. Before 2019, abortion had been severely restricted outside of Mexico City, where it was legalized on-request in 2007. , abortion is available on request to any woman during the first twelve weeks of a pregnancy (i.e., 15 weeks LMP) in Mexico City and the states of Oaxaca, Hidalgo, Veracruz, Coahuila, Colima, Baja California, Sinaloa, Guerrero, Baja California Sur and Quintana Roo.
However, even in states where abortion is legal, there continue to be women in pre-trial detention for murder due to the spontaneous miscarriage of a pregnancy induced by rape.

History 

In 1931, fourteen years after the writing of the national Constitution, the Mexican Government addressed abortion by making it illegal, except in the cases when the abortion is caused by the negligence of the mother, continuation of the pregnancy endangers the life of the mother, or in pregnancy resulting from rape.

In 1974, Mexico introduced the Ley General de Población, a law requiring the government to provide free family planning services in all public health clinics and a National Program for Family Planning to coordinate it. The same year, Mexico amended its constitution to recognize every Mexican citizen's "right to freely decide, in a responsible and informed manner, on the number and spacing of their children." In 1991, the state of Chiapas liberalized the law on abortion.

Until the 1990s, the Mexican government considerably expanded its family planning services to rural areas and less-developed parts of the country, reducing inequalities in family planning services and contraceptive provision. Contraceptive use doubled from 1976, but the annual rate of increase slowed down in 1992 and has come to a standstill in recent years.

According to data provided by the Guttmacher Institute, in 1996, Mexico had the lowest percentage of women in Latin America who underwent an abortion procedure, at 2.5%. In 2009, Mexico's national abortion rate was at about 38 abortions per 1,000 for women between the ages of 15 and 44, at 3.8%. The rates are important to consider because of Mexico's stringent anti-abortion laws and so might not be the most accurate representation of the actual data.

Between 7 and 9 September 2021, in a unanimous 10 to 0 ruling, the Supreme Court of Justice decriminalised abortion in Coahuila and Sinaloa. Nevertheless, the effects of these rulings are broader as it sets a federal binding precedent: judges cannot sentence people to jail for either having or assisting in induced abortions, even if local legislations have not changed their criminal laws. The Supreme Court also established that local rules granting protections of "life from conception" were invalid and that access to legal abortions is a fundamental right. This historic landmark paves the path for advocates to challenge abortion restrictions in each state.

Legality 

On 24 April 2007, the Legislative Assembly of the Federal District (LAFD) reformed Articles 145 to 148 of the Criminal Code and Article 14 of the Health Code, all dealing with abortion; 46 of the 66 members (from five distinct parties) of the LAFD approved the new legislation. The changes expanded the previous law, which had allowed legal abortions in four limited circumstances. 
In Mexico, abortion proceedings fall under local state legislation. A landmark Supreme Court decision in 2008 found no legal impediment to it in the Mexican Constitution and stated that "to affirm that there is an absolute constitutional protection of life in gestation would lead to the violation of the fundamental rights of women".

All states' penal codes permit abortions in cases of rape, and all but Guanajuato and Querétaro's permit it to save the mother's life. Fourteen out of thirty-one expand these cases to include severe fetal deformities, and the state of Yucatán includes economic factors when the mother has previously given birth to three or more children. Nevertheless, according to Jo Tuckman of The Guardian, in practice, almost no state provided access to abortions in the cases listed,
and since the Supreme Court decision, abortion providers, regardless of medical qualifications, are not prosecuted for carrying out abortions.

There are, however, some exceptions. Since 2007, Mexico City, where approximately 7.87% of the national population lives, offers abortion on request to any woman up to 12 weeks into a pregnancy, which, along with Cuba and Uruguay and Argentina, is one of the most liberal legislations on this matter in Latin America. In contrast, recent political lobbying on behalf of the dominant Roman Catholic Church and anti-abortion organizations has resulted in the amendment of more than half of the state constitutions, which now define a fertilized human egg as a person with a right to legal protection. , none of those states removed its exceptions to abortion to reflect the changes in its constitution, but according to Human Rights Watch and a local NGO, over the past eight years, the conservative-leaning state of Guanajuato "has denied every petition by a pregnant rape victim for abortion services", and about 130 of its residents have been sentenced for seeking or providing illegal abortion. However, these days the government is aware of the existence of the institution called 'Las Libres de Guanajuato' which provides abortions and support for women in need, and ignores its existence.

Following the decriminalization of abortions in the Distrito Federal, also known as Mexico City, the states of Baja California and San Luis Potosí enacted laws in 2008 bestowing "personhood" rights from the moment of conception. In September 2011, the Supreme Court rejected two actions to overturn the laws enacted by the states of Baja California and San Luis Potosí for unconstitutionality. The Court recognized "the power of the state legislature" to enact laws on the subject. However, their decision does not criminalize or decriminalize abortion in Mexico.

The September 2021 Supreme Court's ruling states that embryos cannot have the same rights and protections to any born person. Fetuses have protections that increment with time but will never be ahead to the reproductive freedom of the pregnant woman. It also declared that clandestine abortions put the lives of any woman at risk, creates inequality, and produce unnecessary fears over health professionals (doctors and nurses). Thus, the illegality of abortion contravenes article 4 of the Mexican Constitution which allows reproductive rights and access to health services to any Mexican citizen.

This total decriminalisation is the first step towards total legalisation. Just like same-sex marriage, each of the 28 local legislations that do not allow safe and free abortions on request will now be forced to change their laws. Each state will establish the frame of time (weeks or months of the pregnancy) to have access to an elective abortion. Many NGOs like GIRE have declared they will push for the twelve week frame just like in Mexico City, Oaxaca, Hidalgo and Veracruz. If local legislations do not change anything, the Supreme Court could intervene declaring unconstitutionality (like in Coahuila and Sinaloa in September 2021), pushing even more for legalisation. Also, amparos would be automatically granted to any citizen that wants to exercise their right to abortion on those states that have not changed the law.

After this last ruling, public institutions like the Instituto de la Defensoría Pública Federal declared they will help all those women, on any state, under prosecution or in jail, accused of any criminal charge related to induced abortion. In Mexico, Supreme Court rulings are not retroactive except when human rights are involved. Local attorneys on those states that have not changed their laws could still prosecute people that have undergone abortions, specially those more conservative, but judges will not whatsoever declare them guilty. Some hardline conservative judges may still try to incarcerate someone, but that case would escalate to higher judicial institutions that will automatically invalidate the sentence, and the judge would be heavily punished for human rights violations.

State law and court decisions

The National Supreme Court of Justice ruled on 7 August 2019 that rape victims have the right to receive abortions in public hospitals. Girls younger than 12 need parental permission.

On 25 September 2019, Oaxaca became the second state, after Mexico City, to decriminalise abortion up to 12 weeks of pregnancy. The vote in the state legislature was 24 in favor and 12 against. It is estimated that before decriminalisation 9,000 illegal abortions were performed in Oaxaca every year, 17% of them on women of 20 or younger. Abortion was the third cause of maternal mortality, and there were 20 women in prison for illegal abortions.

In October 2019, Las Comisiones Unidas de Procuración y Administración de Justicia y de Igualdad de Género (The United Commissions for the Procuration and Administration of Justice and Gender Equality) in Puebla voted against decriminalization of abortion and legalization of same-sex marriage. The penalty for abortion was reduced from five years to one year. A majority of the legislators were elected by the Together We Will Make History coalition and Marcelo García Almaguer of National Action Party called out members of National Regeneration Movement for doublespeak since they call themselves "progressives" yet voted to support the criminalization of women.

In September 2021, the Supreme Court of Justice ordered the state of Coahuila (articles 196, 198 and 199) and the state of Sinaloa (article 4 Bis A) to remove sanctions and restrictions for abortion from its criminal code and local Constitution respectively. This decision stems from 2017 when former Attorney General, Raúl Cervantes, challenged the constitunionality of both laws. That same day, the Government of the state of Coahuila ordered the immediate liberation of all women imprisoned on Pre-Trial Detention. Those women with a previous sentence will be released with the aid of an amparo.

Timeline

Influence from CEDAW
The Convention on the Elimination of All Forms of Discrimination against Women (CEDAW) was created with the idea of eliminating discrimination against women, in both the private and public sectors. While within the treaty itself there is no mention or use of the word abortion, CEDAW has made clear that abortion restrictions are to be viewed as a form of discrimination against women. CEDAW, therefore, encourages the international community to reduce restrictions or outright legalize abortions.

Mexico is a party to CEDAW, meaning not only has Mexico signed CEDAW but has also ratified it (or in other words incorporated the treaty into the nation's domestic laws). As a party to CEDAW, this allows the CEDAW committee to monitor and review Mexico's policies and practices which affect the rights of women. The CEDAW Committee's recommendations to the Mexican State in 2006 specifically mention these issues. As of September 2021, Mexico City, Oaxaca, Veracruz and Hidalgo allow abortions with few restrictions, and with Mexico's Supreme Court recent ruling Coahuila, another Mexican state, must move towards decriminalizing abortion.

Effects of legislation
With the new legislation, the law redefines the term abortion. An abortion is the legal termination of a pregnancy of 13 weeks of gestation or more. During the first 12 weeks of gestation, the procedure is labeled the "legal termination of pregnancy'. In addition, the term pregnancy was officially defined as beginning when the embryo is implanted in the endometrium. This helps to determine gestational age, and, according to the research team of Maria Sanchez Fuentes, "implicitly legitimizes any post-coital contraceptive method, including emergency contraception ... and assisted reproduction (including infertility treatments such as IVF) and stem-cell research". Women charged with having an illegal abortion have their sentences reduced, and the penalty for forcing a woman to have an abortion against her own will, which includes her partner or a physician, is increased. If physical violence is involved, the penalty is even higher. Furthermore, the law explicitly states that sexual and reproductive health are a priority in health services, with the goal of preventing unwanted pregnancies and sexually transmitted infections (STIs).

According to an unofficial report by the organization Grupo de Información en Reproducción Elegida (GIRE), between 2009 and 2011, 679 women have charged with the crime of abortion in the interior of the country. In the report, GIRE states that having legislation for each entity makes "access to abortion a matter of social injustice and gender discrimination." Although there are no official figures on clandestine abortions in the country, GIRE estimated that in 2009 159,000 women rushed to a hospital for complications of unsafe and illegal abortions.

Impact on health and the economy
Research done by Maria Sanchez Fuentes et al. concludes that the health and economic costs of unsafe abortion are very high, in common with other preventable illnesses. Moreover, those costs are higher for poor women, because only women with economic means and sufficient information can access abortion under safe medical conditions in Mexico, or travel to foreign countries where abortion is legal throughout. After the amendments to the abortion law in 2007, abortion services are now free of charge in public hospitals for Mexico City residents, who account for approximately one-quarter of the country's population, and are available for a moderate fee for women from other states or countries.

Before the passage of the amendments to the abortion law, many Mexican women would buy herbs from the market and try dangerous home versions of abortion in order to end their unwanted pregnancies. Women also resorted to buying prescription drugs, obtained from pharmacists without a doctor's signature, that would induce an abortion. Moreover, some women even ingested huge doses of drugs for arthritis and gastritis, available over the counter, which can cause miscarriages. All of these methods are significantly dangerous, and most are illegal.

The fifth leading cause of maternal mortality in Mexico is illegal, unsafe abortion. A huge proportion of poor and young women are forced to risk their health and lives in the conditions under which many clandestine abortions are practiced. 
This highlights the costs of unsafe abortion to the public health system. In addition, women who undergo unsafe abortions and suffer complications or death represent the fourth highest cause of hospital admissions in Mexico's public hospitals. The Department of Health statistics show that in Mexico City, maternal mortality has been reduced significantly since the passage of the new law.

During 2008, the public health sector, under Mexico City's Department of Health, carried out 13,057 legal abortions, compared to 66 abortions between 2002 and 2007, when the legal indications were restricted to the four circumstances of rape, danger to the woman's life and health and congenital malformations. At the end of April 2007, the city's Department of Health started providing first trimester abortions free of charge to the estimated 43 percent of women residing in Mexico City with no public health insurance.

Demographics and public opinion 

A 2008 study funded by the National Population Council (CONAPO), El Colegio de México and the Guttmacher Institute estimated 880,000 abortions carried out annually, with an average of 33 abortions a year for every 1,000 women between the ages of 15 and 44. However, such studies are speculative—as abortion is highly restricted and reliable data is not readily available—with some estimates ranging as low as 297,000 abortions per year.

By 19 January 2011, 52,484 abortions have been carried out in Mexico City since its decriminalization in 2007, where some 85 percent of the gynecologists in the city's public hospitals have declared themselves conscientious objectors. Among the petitioners, 78% were local residents, 21% were living out-of-state and 1% were foreigners from countries such as Germany, Argentina and Canada. As for their age, 0.6% were between 11 and 14, 47.6% were between 18 and 24, 22% between 25 and 29, 13% between 30 and 34 and 2.7% between 40 and 44 years old. More than half were single.

As of April 2012, roughly 78,544 women had undergone free legal terminations of pregnancy (LTP) without major complications—an average of 15,709 per year since the law passed in 2007. According to the United Nations, more than 500,000 Mexican women seek illegal abortions every year, with more than 2,000 dying from botched or unsafe procedures.

Political community
In the presidential election of 2006, a conservative candidate from the PAN won the election by an "infinitesimal percentage, and the progressive PRD candidate claimed fraud." An article by Sanchez Fuentes et al., suggested that this caused polarization between the two parties and within Mexican society in general. Since the PRD lost the presidential election, but maintained control of the local legislature and Mayor's Office in Mexico City, they demonstrated the differences between the left- and right-wing parties in the reproductive-rights context by supporting the change in the law.

In 2007, the legal proposal to decriminalize abortion, led by the PRI, was introduced in the Mexico City Legislative Assembly (LAFD). In this Mexico City abortion reform, "the policy community (including the center-left political parties; the Mexico City government, represented by the Mayor's Office; the local Ministry of Health; and the local Human Rights Ombudsman), along with academics, opinion leaders, and leading scientists, was very much united, and vocal in support of decriminalization". Mexico City's then-mayor Marcelo Ebrard, from the PRD, declared, "This is a women's cause, but it is also the city's cause." Manifestations of support for the bill came in the form of public announcements by public figures, printed in national newspapers, which are a key means of influencing public opinion and debate in Mexico, as well as via press declarations, and interviews, as suggested by. A public announcement published on 17 April 2007 by the Academy of Bioethics, which outlined why the decriminalization of up to 12 weeks was not contradictory to scientific evidence, affirmed that "an embryo at this stage has not developed a cerebral cortex or nerve endings, does not feel pain, and is not a human being or person". Sanchez Fuentes et al. concluded that this bioethics perspective influenced the discourse surrounding the debate.

On 31 December 2020, President Andrés Manuel López Obrador proposed that the government sponsor a consultation among the nation's women regarding the legalization of abortion. After Mexico's Supreme Court ruling, President López Obrador remained noncommittal on the subject and stated "If it's already at the Supreme Court, then let it be resolved there."

Anti-abortion movement by the Catholic Church
Knowing the potential involvement of the Catholic church on this reform, LAFD pitched the debate as a necessary protection for women, particularly poor women. This justification was meant to resonate especially with the largely Catholic population, religious interest groups, and the Catholic healthcare professionals. While public opinion in Mexico City is largely in favor of legal abortion, the negotiation with religious as well as conscientiously objecting doctors and nurses was proven difficult. Their religious faith had a major impact on the negotiation, because of Catholic's view on abortion as a sin.

The anti-abortion movement in Mexico has been led by the Catholic Church. The Church remains influential in Mexico, and in any discussion of abortion, the government must discuss the reactions and policies of the Church. It is also the Church's influence that has guided the debate towards a health rationale rather than a choice rationale—staying away from a pro-choice stance. After the law was passed in April 2007, the Catholic Church collected 70,000 signatures supporting an abortion referendum.

Under Articles 6 and 24, the Mexican constitution protects citizens with freedom of religion in Mexico. During the first few weeks after the law passed in 2007, many doctors and nurses did not partake in abortions due to their faith. The LAFD dealt with the Church's influence on public hospitals and their employees by reinforcing the reforms made in the Robles law (the law permitting abortion to be legal in Federal District (Mexico) and requiring, in Article 14 Bis 6 of the Health Law, that once again hospitals must have non-objecting doctors on call for abortions). The Robles Law uses language that makes it clear that the right to object on religious grounds is not absolute and that the woman's right to receive the abortion trumps the doctor's right to object where no non-objecting doctor can be located. Furthermore, Article 14 Bis 3 established the Clinical Commission for Evaluation to ensure that doctors were performing abortions and that every time a woman requests information about an abortion, it is recorded by an independent, centralized body of the government. Former Secretary of Health, Manuel Mondragon, under the Mayor of Mexico City, Marcelo Ebrard, worked to make sure that abortions were readily available to women who sought them under the legal circumstances. Essentially, the law incorporates a conscientious objection exemption for health care providers, and similarly requires that hospitals then provide a woman with an alternate provider, who will perform the abortion. Furthermore, the separation of church and state is enshrined in the Mexican Reform Laws of 1859. Therefore, the attempt by the Church to influence politics was illegal. The major separation of the church and state did not permit for religious reasoning to be the major influence on policies, but the Catholic church threatened to prohibit the individuals supporting the policy from attending any religious sanctions and ceremonies.

According to Sanchez Fuentes et al., more than 80 percent of the women who have sought services are Catholic, and formally educated, claiming to help destigmatize abortion, influencing public opinion.

Recent surveys
In a May 2005 Consulta Mitofsky survey, when asked, "Would you agree or disagree with the legalization of abortion in Mexico?", 51% of polltakers said that they would disagree, 47.9% said that they would agree, and 1.1% said that they were unsure.
A November 2005 IMO survey found that 73.4% of Mexicans think abortion should not be legalized, while 11.2% think it should.
 A January 2007 Consulta Mitofsky poll examined attitudes toward birth control methods in Mexico, asking, "Currently, there are many methods meant to prevent or terminate a pregnancy. In general, do you agree with the following methods?" 32.1% of respondents stated that they agreed with abortion.
A March 2007 Parametría survey compared the opinions of people living in Mexico City with those living throughout the rest of the country, asking, "Do you agree or disagree with allowing women to have an abortion without being penalized, if the procedure takes place within the first 14 weeks of a pregnancy?" In Mexico City, 44% said they "agree", 38% that they "disagree", 14% that they "neither" agree nor disagree, and 3% that they are "not sure". Throughout the rest of Mexico, 58% of those surveyed said that they "disagree", 23% that they "agree", 15% that they "neither" agree nor disagree, and 4% that they are "not sure".
According to a survey in August 2021 made by El Financiero (one of Mexico's leading daily newspapers) and Nación321, asking, "Do you agree or disagree with women's right to abortion allowed by law?": 53% of the total population said they "disagree" and 45% said they 'agree'. Related to gender, 45% of men and 46% of women said they 'agree'. Related to age, 54% of people between 18 and 29 years, 53% of people between 30 and 49 years, and 30% of people older than 50 years; said they 'agree'. Related to level of education, 56% of people with higher education and 36% of people with basic education said they 'agree'. Related to income, 48% of higher to middle-high whilst 41% of lower to middle-low said they 'agree'. The survey shows the trend since February 2019.

See also
Mexico City Policy
Law of Mexico
Verónica Cruz Sánchez

References

Further reading
Singer, Elyse Ona. Lawful Sins: Abortion Rights and Reproductive Governance in Mexico. Stanford: Stanford University Press 2022. 

Mexico
Mexico
Law of Mexico
Society of Mexico
Health in Mexico
Human rights in Mexico
Women's rights in Mexico